El Centinela may refer to:

 El Centinela, the Spanish-language version of the Catholic Sentinel, published by the Oregon Catholic Press
 El Centinela (Baja California, Mexico), also known as Mount Signal, Baja California, Mexico mountain near California, United States and Mexicali